Allan Bresland (born 16 August 1945) is a former Unionist politician from Northern Ireland representing the Democratic Unionist Party (DUP). 

Bresland was a Member of the Northern Ireland Assembly (MLA) for West Tyrone from 2007 to 2011.

He was educated at Ballylaw Primary School, is a retired lorry driver with the Water Service and was first elected to Strabane District Council in 1993, representing the Glenelly area. He is a member of various bodies including the Drainage Council of Northern Ireland and is current chair of the Western Group Environmental Health Committee. He is also Chairman of North West Passage, which promotes tourism in the area and is a member of the District Policing Partnership in Strabane.

Bresland lives in Sion Mills and is married with four children and six grandchildren. He is a member of the select vestry of the Church of the Good Shepherd, Sion Mills, an active member of the Orange Order and a founder-member of North Tyrone Credit Union. He served as a part-time member of the Ulster Defence Regiment for 15 years.

In 2007, Bresland had among the lowest expenses recipients in the Northern Ireland Assembly at £2,185 from May to October 2007, while others were spending up to £1,000 per week.

References

External links
 Strabane Council
They Work For You
 Official website

1945 births
Living people
Democratic Unionist Party MLAs
Northern Ireland MLAs 2007–2011
Members of Strabane District Council
People from County Tyrone
Ulster Defence Regiment soldiers
Members of Derry City and Strabane District Council